The following is a chronological list of buildings designed by late-19th- and early-20th-century catalog architect, George Franklin Barber (1854–1915). Barber is best known for his houses, but also designed churches, barns, and storefronts.

Key

 CS1 – Design found in Barber's The Cottage Souvenir (c. 1887–1888)
 CS2 — Design found in Barber's The Cottage Souvenir No. 2 (1891)
 CS3 — Design found in Barber's The Cottage Souvenir Revised and Enlarged (1892)
 AH — Design found in Barber's Artistic Homes: How to Plan and Build Them (1895)
 CS4 — Design found in Barber's The Cottage Souvenir, Fourth Edition, Revised (1896)
 APP — Client mentioned in Barber's Appreciation (1896)
 NMD — Design found in Barber's New Model Dwellings (1896)
 HI — Found in Barber's Homes Illustrated (1897)
 MD — Design found in Barber's Modern Dwellings and Their Proper Construction (1898)
 MD2 — Design found in Barber's Modern Dwellings and Their Proper Construction (2nd ed., 1899)
 ART — Design found in Barber's Art In Architecture (c. 1901)
 MD3 — Design found in Barber & Kluttz's Modern Dwellings: A Book of Practical Designs and Plans for Those who wish to Build or Beautify Their Homes (3rd ed., 1901)
 MD4 — Design found in Barber & Kluttz's Modern Dwellings: A Book of Practical Designs and Plans for Those who wish to Build or Beautify Their Homes (4th ed., 1904)
 MD5 — Design found in Barber & Kluttz's Modern Dwellings: A Book of Practical Designs and Plans for Those who wish to Build or Beautify Their Homes (5th ed., 1905)
 AMH5 — Design found in Barber & Kluttz's American Homes: A Book of Everything for Those who are Planning to Build or Beautify Their Homes (5th ed., 1907)
 NRHP — Listed on the National Register of Historic Places, reference number given for individual listings, and name of historic district given for contributing properties
 HABS — Documented by the Historic American Buildings Survey
 R — Remodeled by Barber, with year of remodeling given in "Completed" column

Works

See also
 List of BarberMcMurry works

References

Barber, George Franklin
Works by American people